Laurence Hobgood (born 1959) is a contemporary jazz piano virtuoso, composer, arranger, producer, lyricist and educator. Perhaps best known for his twenty-year collaboration with vocalist Kurt Elling, Hobgood has had a varied and dynamic career. In addition to his prowess at the piano he's identified by many as a key player in the imaginative updating of the "American Songbook", particularly in his arranging for vocalists; his stylized re-imagining of both classic songbook repertoire and more recent artists' work (Carole King; Earth, Wind & Fire; Paul Simon; Burt Bacharach; Sting; U2, etc.) has had a far-ranging influence within the jazz world and beyond.

Early life

Born Dec. 23, 1959, in Salisbury, North Carolina, Laurence is the son of Burnet Mclean and Jane Bishop Hobgood. His father was the director of the small but thriving Theater Department at Catawba College. Soon the family moved to Ithaca, New York, where his father earned his Ph.D., then again to Dallas, Texas, in 1964 where Burnet served as Chairman of the Southern Methodist University (SMU) Department of Theater for eleven years.

In Dallas Hobgood attended Lakewood Elementary School and J.L. Long Junior High School. He also began piano study, beginning in SMU's piano prep program, but moving quickly to private lessons with Kenneth Newsome, and then Dorothy Brin Crocker, a celebrated children's piano teacher in the Southwest. His first forays into composing and improvising happened during this period; his emerging improvisational instinct was not always a welcome influence during his classical study.

In 1975 the Hobgoods moved to Urbana, Illinois, where Burnet assumed the Chair of the Theater program at University of Illinois. During high school Hobgood studied jazz for the first time with Tony Caramia, a new professor in piano pedagogy but an accomplished jazz player. In the fall of 1978, after entering the University of Illinois Music Department, Hobgood returned to classical study with notable British pianist Ian Hobson. It was during his lessons with Hobson that Hobgood learned the technical system that cemented his approach and that he still practices today.

Despite the profound impact made by teachers like Hobson, John Garvey, and Sal Martirano (composition), Hobgood chose to leave school after two and a half years and dedicate himself solely to jazz practice, both playing and composing/arranging. His remaining years in Champaign/Urbana were spent leading a trio and focusing on developing his playing and writing.

In 1988 he moved to Chicago. After some time getting established in the jazz scene several key developments occurred almost simultaneously: he was invited to join the regular Monday night band (led by Ed Peterson) at the storied Green Mill Cocktail Lounge; he started playing with drummer Paul Wertico (which eventually led to the formation of Trio New with bassist Eric Hochberg); and he was invited to play in the resident jazz ensemble of the Aspen Music Festival (1990, ’91, ’92.)

In 1993 he met a young, still unknown jazz singer named Kurt Elling. Hobgood served as Elling’s music director producing, playing on, and composing/arranging for Elling’s first ten records (six for Blue Note and four for Concord.) All ten were Grammy nominated and Hobgood also garnered two nominations for his arranging on "Flirting With Twilight" and "Dedicated To You" respectively. Hobgood received a 2009 Grammy award for his work as producer on "Dedicated To You".

With both Elling and his own groups Hobgood has toured the globe and played at most of the world's most prestigious venues including Carnegie Hall, John F. Kennedy Center for the Performing Arts, Lincoln Center, Sydney Opera House, London's Barbican and Queen Elizabeth Halls, and festivals like Montreaux, Newport, and Spoleto.

Music

Contemporary virtuoso pianist, collaborator, composer, arranger, producer, educator; multiple Grammy nominee and 2010 Grammy winner Laurence Hobgood has enjoyed a multi-faceted and dynamic career.

Perhaps best known as musical director for singer Kurt Elling from 1995-2013 Hobgood played on, composed/arranged for and co-produced ten of Elling's CDs (six for Blue Note and four for Concord), each Grammy nominated. 2009's “Dedicated To You: Kurt Elling sings The Music Of Coltrane and Hartman”, recorded live at Lincoln Center, won the 2010 Grammy Award for Best Vocal Jazz Record, with Hobgood receiving one of the coveted statues for his work as producer.
Hobgood was awarded three consecutive fellowships (1990, 1991, 1992) to perform in the Aspen Music Festival. The Chicago Tribune honored him as a 1995 Chicagoan of the Year in the Arts. In 2003 he received a Deems Taylor Award, given by ASCAP for the year's outstanding music journalism, for his article, “The Art Of The Trio”, published by JazzTimes magazine.

His 2007 CD, When The Heart Dances (Naim), a duet recording with iconic bassist Charlie Haden, has received worldwide critical acclaim, garnering four-star reviews from Down Beat and the United Kingdom's Mojo magazine among others.

Hobgood's February 2012 release, POEMJAZZ (Circumstantial), is an adventurous collaboration with poet Robert Pinsky, the only three-term U.S. Poet Laureate. It features Pinsky's energetic readings of his poems with an emphasis on musical phrasing (as opposed to "dramatic" phrasing) coupled with Hobgood's engaging, thematic improvised accompaniment, played live in studio simultaneous with the distinguished poet's recitations. A second POEMJAZZ record is forthcoming.
His 2012 CD, Laurence Hobgood Quartet Featuring Ernie Watts (Circumstantial), recorded live at the Jazz Kitchen in Indianapolis, features vibrant performances of all original repertoire.

Hobgood's 2013 release “Christmas” was chosen by The New York Times and The Chicago Tribune as one of the top holiday CDs of the year. In The New York Times, Nate Chinen said, “For most of this beautifully recorded album, he’s alone at the piano, unspooling solemn reveries after the example of his north star, Keith Jarrett.” And the Chicago Tribune's Howard Reich wrote, “Can overplayed holiday repertoire be transformed into art? It can when Hobgood is at work, the pianist turning in one of the most appealing recordings of an already distinguished career with 'Christmas.'”

2013 also saw the debut of the Laurence Hobgood Quintet featuring Ernie Watts. Downbeat magazine's review of a performance concluded, “Hobgood obviously embraced his leadership role, playfully interacting with the audience and providing insight between each composition. Whatever he ends up doing next with his pen and piano, it will no doubt be swinging. And he’ll have plenty of fans anxiously awaiting to hear his future projects.

In April and May 2014 Hobgood began a new collaboration with Chicago vocalist Tammy McCann, arranging, playing and producing Tammy's "Love Stories" project. In December of 2014 Hobgood recorded a new trio project, Honor Thy Fathers, with bassist John Patitucci and drummer Kendrick Scott, scheduled for September 2015, release. Recorded at New York's Sear Sound, the album features original compositions and novel arrangements of standard and popular tunes (Stevie Wonder's "If It's Magic" as an up- tempo burner, for example), each dedicated to one of Hobgood's personal influences/ inspirations.

Hobgood has performed with his own groups, Elling and others at Carnegie Hall, Lincoln Center, John F. Kennedy Center for the Performing Arts, Ozawa Hall at Tanglewood, the Chicago Symphony Center and Ravinia, Sydney Opera House, London's Barbican and Queen Elizabeth Halls, as well as the world's most prestigious jazz festivals including Montreaux, North Sea, Monterey, Spoleto USA, Newport, Umbria, Montreal, JVC festivals in Paris and Japan and many others. Hobgood also appeared with Elling at the 2009 State Dinner given at the White House where President Barack Obama welcomed India's Prime Minister Manmohan Singh.

He has played and/or recorded with Larry Coryell, Lee Konitz, John Patitucci, Jon Hendricks, Regina Carter, Stefon Harris, Arturo Sandoval, Richard Galliano, Christian McBride, Esperanza Spalding, Terreon Gully, Terrence Blanchard, Bob Sheppard, Ernie Watts, Marc Johnson, Joe Lovano, Benny Maupin, Paul Wertico, Bobby Watson, Clark Terry, Kurt Rosenwinkel, Anat Cohen, Bob Mintzer, Mark Murphy, Von Freeman, Peter Erskine, Paul McCandless, Gary Burton and Eddie Daniels, among others.

Discography
Left To My Own Devices (Naim, 2000)
Crazy World (Naim, 2005)
When The Heart Dances  featuring Charlie Haden (Naim, 2009)
POEMJAZZ  duet with Robert Pinsky (Circumstantial, 2012)
Laurence Hobgood Quartet Live  feat. Ernie Watts (Circumstantial, 2012)
Christmas (Circumstantial, 2013)

Pianist, musical director, producer, arranger  
 No One Ever Tells You (1992) Eden Atwood
 Castle Creek Shuffle (1995) Jeff Benedict
 Close Your Eyes (1995) Kurt Elling
 The Messenger (1997) Kurt Elling
 Union (1997)  co-op trio with Paul Wertico and Brian Torff
 This Time It's Love (1998) Kurt Elling
 State Of The Union (1999)  co-op trio with Paul Wertico and Brian Torff
 Live In Chicago (2000) Kurt Elling
 Flirting With Twilight (2001) Kurt Elling
 Man in the Air (2003) Kurt Elling
 Split Decision (2004) Jim Gailloreto
 Love Is Blue (2004) Jackie Allen
 Tangled (2006) Jackie Allen
 Nightmoves (2007) Kurt Elling
 Dedicated to You: Kurt Elling Sings the Music of Coltrane and Hartman (2009) Kurt Elling
 Quartet (2009) Rob Parton
 The Gate (2011) Kurt Elling
 1619 Broadway - The Brill Building Project (2012) Kurt Elling
 Southern Comfort (2014) Regina Carter
 Love Stories (2014) Tammy McCann
 Timeless (2014) Alicia Olatuja
 It's a Man's World (2015) Carter Calvert

Awards and nominations
Grammy Awards

|-
|rowspan="2"|2001
|Flirting with Twilight Kurt Elling
| Best Jazz Vocal Album
|
|-
|"Easy Living"
|Best Instrumental Arrangement Accompanying a Vocalist
|
|-
||2009
|Dedicated to You Kurt Elling
|Best Jazz Vocal Album
|
|-
||2009
|Dedicated to You Kurt Elling
|Best Instrumental Arrangement Accompanying a Vocalist
|

Other awards

|-
||2009
|"The Art of The Trio" JazzTimes Magazine
|ASCAP Outstanding Music Journalism
|

References

1959 births
Living people
20th-century American composers
Record producers from North Carolina
University of Illinois alumni
20th-century American pianists
American male pianists
American male composers
21st-century American pianists
20th-century American male musicians
21st-century American male musicians